Spondias dulcis (syn. In the English speaking Caribbean it is typically known as golden apple and elsewhere in the Caribbean as pommecythere or cythere. In Polynesia it is known as vī.

Description
The tree produces small, inconspicuous white flowers in terminal panicles. Over several weeks, the fruit fall to the ground while still green and hard, then turn golden-yellow as they ripen. According to Morton (1987), "some fruits in the South Sea Islands weigh over  each."

Habitat
Spondias dulcis has been introduced into tropical areas across the world. It was brought to Jamaica in 1782, and it is cultivated in Panama, Cuba, Haiti, the Dominican Republic, Puerto Rico, Suriname, Brazil, Grenada, Trinidad and Tobago,  St. Lucia, and eastern Sucre in Venezuela. The United States Department of Agriculture received seeds from Liberia in 1909, but it did not become a popular crop in the US. Nevertheless, it is grown in South Florida as far north as Palm Beach County. The fruit is also widely grown in Somalia's agriculture belt, probably introduced during the colonial times preceding 1960.

As food
Spondias dulcis is most commonly used as a food source. It is a very nutritional food containing Vitamin B,C, and A. In West Java, its young leaves are used as seasoning for pepes. In Costa Rica, the more mature leaves are also eaten as a salad green though they are tart. However, it is most commonly used for its fruit.

The fruit may be eaten raw; the flesh is crunchy and a little sour.  According to Boning (2006): "The fruit is best when fully colored, but still somewhat crunchy.  At this stage, it has a pineapple-mango flavor.  The flesh is golden in color, very juicy, vaguely sweet, but with a hint of tart acidity."  In Indonesia and Malaysia, it is eaten with shrimp paste, a thick, black, salty-sweet sauce called hayko in the Southern Min dialect of Chinese. It is an ingredient in rujak in Indonesia and rojak in Malaysia. The juice is called kedondong in Indonesia, amra in Malaysia, and balonglong in Singapore.

The fruit is made into preserves and flavorings for sauces, soups, braised and stews. In Fiji it is made into jam, its leaves are used to flavour meat. In Samoa and Tonga it is used to make otai. In Sri Lanka the fruit is soaked in vinegar with chili and other spices to make acharu. In Vietnam the unripe fruit is eaten with salt, sugar, and chili, or with shrimp paste. Children eat the fruit macerated in artificially sweetened licorice extract. In Jamaica, it is mostly considered a novelty, especially by children. It can be eaten with salt or made into a drink sweetened with sugar and spiced with ginger. It is also used to make juice in Grenada and Saint Lucia. In Trinidad and Tobago, it is curried, sweetened, salted, or flavored with pepper sauce and spices. In Cambodia it is made into a salad called nhoam mkak (/ɲŏam məkaʔ/ ញាំម្កាក់). In Suriname and Guyana, the fruit is dried and made into a spicy chutney, mixed with garlic and peppers. In Thai cuisine both the fruits and the tender leaves are eaten.

Vernacular names

Adavi Mamidi — Telugu
Amra Kai (மாரிமா) — Tamil
Ambade — Tulu
Ambado — Konkani

Ambarella or Cythere — Dutch
Ambazhanga — Malayalam
Ambra — Malaysian and Sarawakian Malay 
Amokana — Hokkien
Amrah (अमरा/) — Caribbean Hindustani and Fiji Hindi
Amra (আমড়া), Biliti — Bengali
Amte kai — Kannada
Anbulha އަނބުޅަ — Dhivehi language, Republic of Maldives
Balolong — Cebuano language, (Philippines)
Buah Long Long — Singlish
Cajá-manga — Brazil
Casharana, taperibá — Peru
Cas Mango — Cameroon
Chook-chook plum — Sierra Leone
Ciruelo — Ecuador
Cóc — Vietnamese
Dhondhong — Javanese
Embe ng'ong'o or  Embe Kizungu — Tanzania
Evi — Réunion
Fruit de Cythère — Mauritius
Frisiter — Mauritius, Seychelles
Golden apple — Saint Kitts and Nevis, St Lucia, Barbados, Guyana, Saint Vincent and the Grenadines, Grenada
Goldpflaume — German
Golden plum — Belize, Liberia
Green Jungle — Papua New GuineaGway — BurmeseHeining – MeiteiIsbaandhays or Isbaandhees — Somali, SomaliaJew Plum  — JamaicaJocote de Mico — GuatemalaJobo indio — SpanishJune Plum — Jamaica, BermudaKedondong — Indonesian (also various Indonesian ethnic languages), Malaysian, and Sarawakian Malay (also used for Spondias mangifera)Kedongdong — BalineseMakok farang (มะกอกฝรั่ง) — ThaiManga zi nsende — KikongoMangotin — PanamaManzana de oro — Dominican RepublicMkak (ម្កាក់) — KhmerNaos — BislamanOmora (অমৰা) — AssamesePommisitair — SurinamePonm sité, pomme cythère — DominicaPrune de Cythère, pommecythere — French West Indies (Martinique, Guadeloupe), Guyane, Trinidad and TobagoIsbaandhees - SomaliaSakoa — MalagasyUmbra — MalaysiaTamzinthai — RongmeiVī — Samoan, Tongan, NiueanVi kavakava — Cook Islands MaoriWi'' — Fijian, Hawaiian

References

External links

dulcis
Tropical fruit
Flora of Christmas Island
Flora of Nepal